Langton is a village and civil parish in County Durham, in England. It is situated to the west of Darlington, near Headlam and Ingleton. The population of the civil Parish taken at the 2011 Census was less than 100. Information is contained in the parish of Ingleton, County Durham.

References

External links

Villages in County Durham